Per-Anton Lundstrom (born September 29, 1977) is a Swedish former professional ice hockey defenceman.

Lundstrom had an extensive career playing in the Swedish Hockey League.

Lundstrom was indirectly part of the trade of Teemu Selanne from the Winnipeg Jets to the Anaheim Ducks.  Lundstrom was the 62nd pick of the 1996 NHL Entry Draft by the Winnipeg Jets with a pick that was traded from Anaheim to Winnipeg for Selanne (with other assets changing teams as well).

References

External links

1977 births
Living people
Skellefteå AIK players
Swedish ice hockey defencemen
Djurgårdens IF Hockey players
Arizona Coyotes draft picks